Ken Schretzmann is an American film editor known for animated features such as Cars (2006), Toy Story 3 (2010), The Lorax (2012), and The Secret Life of Pets (2016) as well as The Willoughbys (2020) and Pinocchio (2022).

Schretzmann received a bachelor's degree from Syracuse University in 1982. For about 12 years, Schretzmann worked on several animated features at Pixar Animation Studios, and received an ACE Eddie Award for Best Edited Animated Feature for the Pixar film Toy Story 3 (2010). Based on her interview of Schretzmann, Bobbie O'Steen describes the substantial differences between editing Pixar's animated feature films and editing a live-action feature. Among others, the animated films at Pixar each involved about 4 years of Schretzmann's work. He said, "‘What took you so long? It’s kind of a backwards process. You edit first then they shoot the film later. It’s a long haul and for about the first two years we’re in the story process.”

Schretzmann has been selected for membership in the American Cinema Editors.

References

Further reading

Year of birth missing (living people)
Living people
American film editors
American Cinema Editors
Syracuse University alumni
Pixar people
Illumination (company) people